Alban Birch (by 1526–1599?), of Leominster, Herefordshire, was an English politician.

He was a Member (MP) of the Parliament of England for Leominster in 1558.

References

1599 deaths
People from Leominster
English MPs 1558
Year of birth uncertain